Alejandro 'Álex' Felip Selma (born 3 April 1992) is a Spanish footballer who plays for CE L'Hospitalet as a central midfielder.

Club career
Born in Castellón de la Plana, Valencian Community, Felip joined CD Castellón's youth setup in 2004, aged 12. He made his senior debuts in the 2010–11 season, being relegated from Segunda División B.

On 1 August 2013 Felip moved to Getafe CF, being assigned to the reserves also in the third level. On 14 January 2015 he played his first match with the main squad, starting in a 1–0 home win against UD Almería, for the campaign's Copa del Rey.

Felip made his La Liga debut four days later, coming on as a late substitute for Sammir in a 0–3 home loss against Real Madrid. On 3 July he left the club, after appearing in ten league matches with the main squad.

In August 2015 Felip joined Elche CF on a trial basis. After suffering an injury in the pre-season, he was offered a contract only in October, and officially registered in January 2016 due to the lack of a professional contract in the previous campaign.

References

External links

1992 births
Living people
Sportspeople from Castellón de la Plana
Spanish footballers
Footballers from the Valencian Community
Association football midfielders
La Liga players
Segunda División players
Segunda División B players
Tercera División players
CD Castellón footballers
Getafe CF B players
Getafe CF footballers
Elche CF players
Racing de Ferrol footballers
Atlético Saguntino players
Ontinyent CF players
Lleida Esportiu footballers
CE L'Hospitalet players